The following outline is provided as an overview of and topical guide to the U.S. state of Virginia:

Virginia (officially, the Commonwealth of Virginia) –   U.S. state located in the South Atlantic region of the United States. Virginia is nicknamed the "Old Dominion" due to its status as a former dominion of the English Crown, and "Mother of Presidents" due to the most U.S. presidents having been born there. The geography and climate of the Commonwealth are shaped by the Blue Ridge Mountains and the Chesapeake Bay, which provide habitat for much of its flora and fauna. The capital of the Commonwealth is Richmond; Virginia Beach is the most populous city, and Fairfax County is the most populous political subdivision. The Commonwealth's estimated population as of 2013 is over 8.2 million.

General reference 

 Names
 Common name: Virginia
 Pronunciation: 
 Official name:  Commonwealth of Virginia
 Abbreviations and name codes
 Postal symbol:  VA
 ISO 3166-2 code:  US-VA
 Internet second-level domain:  .va.us
 Nicknames
 Mother of Presidents
 The Old Dominion
 The Commonwealth
 Adjectivals:  Virginia, Virginian
 Demonym:  Virginian

Geography of Virginia 

Geography of Virginia
 Virginia is: a U.S. state, a federal state of the United States of America
 Location
 Northern hemisphere
 Western hemisphere
 Americas
 North America
 Anglo America
 Northern America
 United States of America
 Contiguous United States
 Eastern United States
 East Coast of the United States
 Mid-Atlantic states
 Southeastern United States
 Southern United States
 Population of Virginia: 8,001,024  (2010 U.S. Census)
 Area of Virginia:
 Atlas of Virginia

Places in Virginia 

 Historic places in Virginia
 Abandoned communities in Virginia
 Ghost towns in Virginia
 National Historic Landmarks in Virginia
 National Register of Historic Places listings in Virginia
 Bridges on the National Register of Historic Places in Virginia
 National Natural Landmarks in Virginia
 National parks in Virginia
 State parks in Virginia

Environment of Virginia 

Environment of Virginia
 Climate of Virginia
 Climate change in Virginia
 Protected areas in Virginia
 State forests of Virginia
 Superfund sites in Virginia

Natural geographic features of Virginia 

 Lakes of Virginia
 Mountains of Virginia
 Gaps of Virginia
 Rivers of Virginia

Regions of Virginia 

 Central Virginia
 Northern Virginia
 Southern Virginia

Administrative divisions of Virginia 

 The 95 Counties and 38 Cities of the Commonwealth of Virginia
 Municipalities in Virginia
 Cities in Virginia
 State capital of Virginia:
 City nicknames in Virginia
 Towns in Virginia
 Unincorporated communities in Virginia

Demography of Virginia 

Demographics of Virginia

Government and politics of Virginia 

Politics of Virginia
 Form of government: U.S. state government
 United States congressional delegations from Virginia
 Virginia State Capitol
 Elections in Virginia
 Electoral reform in Virginia
 Political party strength in Virginia

Branches of the government of Virginia 

Government of Virginia

Executive branch of the government of Virginia 
 Governor of Virginia
 Lieutenant Governor of Virginia
 Secretary of State of Virginia
 State departments
 Virginia Department of Transportation

Legislative branch of the government of Virginia 

 Virginia General Assembly (bicameral)
 Upper house: Virginia Senate
 Lower house: Virginia House of Delegates

Judicial branch of the government of Virginia 

Courts of Virginia
 Supreme Court of Virginia

Law and order in Virginia 

Law of Virginia
 Cannabis in Virginia
 Capital punishment  in Virginia
 Individuals executed in Virginia
 Constitution of Virginia
 Crime in Virginia
 Gun laws in Virginia
 Law enforcement in Virginia
 Law enforcement agencies in Virginia
 Virginia State Police

Military in Virginia 

 Virginia Air National Guard
 Virginia Army National Guard

Local government in Virginia 

Local government in Virginia

History of Virginia 
History of Virginia

History of Virginia, by period 
Prehistory of Virginia
Native American tribes in Virginia
Powhatan
English Colony of Virginia, 1584–1707
Roanoke Colony, 1585–1587
Jamestown, Virginia, 1607–1760
History of slavery in Virginia
Middle Plantation, Virginia, since 1632 (Williamsburg since 1698)
French colony of Louisiane, 1699–1764
British Colony of Virginia, 1707–1776
French and Indian War, 1754–1763
Treaty of Fontainebleau of 1762
Treaty of Paris of 1763
British Indian Reserve, 1763–1783
Royal Proclamation of 1763
Dunmore's War 1774
American Revolutionary War, 1775–1783
United States Declaration of Independence of 1776
Treaty of Paris of 1783
Commonwealth of Virginia since 1776
Cherokee–American wars, 1776–1794
First state to ratify the Articles of Confederation and Perpetual Union, signed July 9, 1778
Northwestern territorial claims ceded 1784
Tenth state to ratify the Constitution of the United States of America on June 25, 1788
George Washington becomes the first President of the United States on April 30, 1789
Separation of the Commonwealth of Kentucky, 1792
Thomas Jefferson becomes the third President of the United States on March 4, 1801
James Madison becomes the fourth President of the United States on March 4, 1809
War of 1812, 1812–1815
Treaty of Ghent, December 24, 1814
James Monroe becomes the fifth President of the United States on March 4, 1817
William Henry Harrison becomes ninth President of the United States on March 4, 1841
John Tyler becomes the tenth President of the United States on April 4, 1841
Mexican–American War, April 25, 1846 – February 2, 1848
Zachary Taylor becomes 12th President of the United States on March 4, 1849
Virginia in the American Civil War, 1861–1865
Confederate States of America, 1861–1865
Eighth state to declare secession from the United States on April 17, 1861
Eighth state admitted to the Confederate States of America on May 7, 1861
Manassas Campaign, July 2–21, 1861
First Battle of Bull Run, July 21, 1861
Battle of Hampton Roads, March 8–9, 1862
Valley Campaign, March 23 – June 9, 1862
Peninsula Campaign, March – July 1862
Battle of Seven Pines, May 31 – June 1, 1862
Seven Days Battles, June 25 – July 1, 1862
Northern Virginia Campaign, July 19 – September 1, 1862
Second Battle of Bull Run, August 29–30, 1862
Battle of Fredericksburg, December 11–15, 1862
Battle of Chancellorsville, May 1–4, 1863
Separation of the State of West Virginia, 1863
Bristoe Campaign, October 14 – November 9, 1863
Overland Campaign, May 5 – June 24, 1864
Battle of the Wilderness, May 5–7, 1864
Battle of Spotsylvania Court House, May 8–21, 1864
Battle of Cold Harbor, May 31 – June 12, 1864
Valley Campaigns, May 15 – October 19, 1864
Bermuda Hundred Campaign, May 6–20, 1864
Siege of Petersburg, June 9, 1864 – March 25, 1865
Appomattox Campaign, March 29 – April 9, 1865
Battle of Five Forks, April 1, 1865
Battle of Appomattox Court House, April 9, 1865
Virginia in Reconstruction, 1865–1870
Eighth former Confederate state readmitted to the United States on January 26, 1870
Woodrow Wilson becomes 28th President of the United States on March 4, 1913
Shenandoah National Park established on December 26, 1935

Culture of Virginia 

Culture of Virginia
 Museums in Virginia
 Religion in Virginia
 The Church of Jesus Christ of Latter-day Saints in Virginia
 Episcopal Diocese of Virginia
 Scouting in Virginia
 State symbols of Virginia
 Flag of the Commonwealth of Virginia 
 Great Seal of the Commonwealth of Virginia

The arts in Virginia 
 Music of Virginia

Sports in Virginia 

Sports in Virginia
 Professional sports teams in Virginia

Economy and infrastructure of Virginia

Economy of Virginia
 Communications in Virginia
 Newspapers in Virginia
 Radio stations in Virginia
 Television stations in Virginia
 Health care in Virginia
 Hospitals in Virginia
 Transportation in Virginia
 Airports in Virginia
 Roads in Virginia
 Interstate Highways in Virginia
 State highways in Virginia

Education in Virginia 

Education in Virginia
 Schools in Virginia
 School districts in Virginia
 High schools in Virginia
 Colleges and universities in Virginia
 University of Virginia
 Virginia State University

See also

 Virginia
 Index of Virginia-related articles

References

External links 

Virginia
Virginia
 1